Almensh Belete (born 26 July 1989 in Addis Ababa) is an Ethiopian-born Belgian long-distance runner. At the 2012 Summer Olympics, she competed in the Women's 5000 metres, finishing 11th in her heat and 19th overall in Round 1, failing to qualify for the final. She also represented Belgium at the 2013 and 2015 World Championships.

Her sister, Mimi Belete, is also a runner, competing internationally for Bahrain.

International competitions

Personal bests
Outdoor
800 metres – 2:03.88 (Liege 2010)
1500 metres – 4:06.87 (Heusden-Zolder 2010)
One mile – 4:28.11 (Leuven 2012)
3000 metres – 8:51.70 (Rieti 2013)
5000 metres – 15:03.63 (Leuven 2011)
10,000 metres – 31:43.05 (Palo Alto 2014)
Indoor
1500 metres – 4:11.36 (Ghent 2013)
3000 metres – 8:54.14 (Eaubonne 2013)

References

Belgian female long-distance runners
1989 births
Living people
Olympic athletes of Belgium
Athletes (track and field) at the 2012 Summer Olympics
Belgian people of Ethiopian descent
Black Belgian sportspeople
Ethiopian emigrants to Belgium
World Athletics Championships athletes for Belgium